Under the Whyte notation for the classification of steam locomotives by wheel arrangement, the  is a Garratt articulated locomotive. The wheel arrangement is effectively two 4-6-0 ten-wheeler locomotives operating back to back, with the boiler and cab suspended between the two swivelling power units. Each power unit has two pairs of leading wheels in a leading bogie, followed by three coupled pairs of driving wheels and no trailing wheels.

On a Mallet locomotive, only the front engine unit swivels while the rear unit is rigid in relation to the main frame.

Overview
This was a rare wheel arrangement for Garratt locomotives, with only seven locomotives built for two South American customers.
 The first was for the metre-gauge Mogyana Railway of Brazil, with five examples built by Beyer, Peacock and Company in 1912 and 1914.
 The other was two locomotives built for the 3-foot gauge Ferrocarril Pacifico de Colombia by Armstrong Whitworth in 1924.

References

6,4-6-0
66,4-6-0+0-6-4